Slide Don't Fret is the thirteenth studio album by Bryn Haworth.

It was recorded in 1995 at The Soundfield, Derbyshire, was produced by Bryn Haworth, co-produced and engineered by Neil Costello and released by Kingsway Records as KMCD932.

Track listing

 "Slide Don't Fret" - 4:41
 "Cajun Song" - 6:04
 "Home Sweet Home" - 4:11
 "Judgement Blues" - 8:34
 "Will You Be Ready" - 3:42
 "Talk To Me" - 5:00
 "Healing on Me" - 3:31
 "All Because Of You" - 4:51
 "I'm Grateful" - 3:37
 "All Things Work Together" - 3:37
 "Time for a Change" - 4:35

All songs written by Bryn Haworth.

Personnel 

Bryn Haworth - guitars, mandolin and lead vocals
Henry Spinetti - drums and percussion
Les Moir - bass
Howard Francis - keyboards
Mal Pope - backing vocals
Karlos Edwards - tambourines and percussion
Steve Gregory - saxophones
Raul D'Oliveira - trumpet
Terry "Tex" Comer - bass
Geraint Watkins - accordion
John Bundrick - Hammond organ
Neil Costello - guitar

Other credits 
Producer - Bryn Haworth
Co-producer and engineer - Nell Costello
Executive Producer - Les Moir
Recorded at - The Soundfield, Derbyshire
Compiled and edited -  Dave Ashton at the Digital Audio Co.
Mastered - Ray Staff at Whitfield Studios
Photography/Design - Paul Yates

1995 albums
Bryn Haworth albums